John Butler (died 1423), of London, was an English politician.

He was a Member (MP) of the Parliament of England for London in 1417.

References

Year of birth missing
1423 deaths
15th-century English people
Members of the Parliament of England for the City of London